Powell Hall (formerly known as the St. Louis Theater and Powell Symphony Hall) is the home of the St. Louis Symphony. It was named after Walter S. Powell, a local St. Louis businessman, whose widow donated $1 million towards the purchase and use of this hall by the symphony. The hall seats 2,683.

The building is a contributing property of the Midtown Historic District on the National Register of Historic Places.

History
The building was originally called The St. Louis Theater. It was built in 1925 with 4,100 seats, designed by the Chicago architectural firm of Rapp & Rapp. The theater spent the first 40 years of its existence as a stage for live vaudeville performances as well as motion pictures. The last movie shown in the old theater was The Sound of Music in 1966. At that time, the building was acquired by the Symphony Society for $500,000, through a gift from Oscar Johnson Jr.. After spending an additional $2 million to update and renovate the theater, the hall re-opened in January 1968 as the new home of the St. Louis Symphony Orchestra.

The building is said to be haunted by the ghost of a man named George. He is supposedly seen in a white suit and white hat and is thought to be that of a former vaudevillian. He is said to play with the lights and the elevators.

Carl Stalling, famous for providing the music to Warner Bros.' Looney Tunes animated series, began his musical career as an organist at the St Louis Theater.

See also
Saint Louis Symphony Orchestra
Fox Theatre (St. Louis)
List of concert halls

References

External links 
slso.org

Buildings and structures in St. Louis
Concert halls in Missouri
Landmarks of St. Louis
Movie palaces
Music venues in St. Louis
Performing arts centers in Missouri
Theatres completed in 1925
Tourist attractions in St. Louis
Historic district contributing properties in Missouri
National Register of Historic Places in St. Louis
Theatres on the National Register of Historic Places in Missouri
1925 establishments in Missouri